Southridge High School may refer to:

 Southridge High School (Kennewick) in Kennewick, Washington, United States
 Southridge High School (Beaverton) in Beaverton, Oregon, United States
 Miami Southridge High School in Miami, Florida, United States
 Southridge School in Surrey, British Columbia, Canada
 PAREF Southridge School in Muntinlupa, Philippines
 Southridge High School (Huntingburg, Indiana), United States

Southridge Mall may refer to:

Southridge Mall (Iowa), in Des Moines, Iowa
Southridge Mall (Wisconsin), in Milwaukee, Wisconsin

Southridge Apartments may refer to:

Southridge Apartments (Utah), in Provo, Utah